The Triumphal Arch is a monument situated in Central Chișinău next to the Nativity Cathedral on Piața Marii Adunǎri Naționale nr. 2 and directly opposite Government House.

History
The Triumphal Arch was built in 1840 by the architect I. Zauschevic and thanks to the governor's of Bessarabia initiative to commemorate the victory of the Russian Empire over the Ottoman Empire during the Russo-Turkish War (1828–29). From its construction to 2011 the monument sheltered at its second level a huge bell of nearly 6.400 kg (400 Puduri).

It was smelted with the copper of the cannons captured by the Russian forces from the Ottoman Empire. The bell "clopote–velican" was initially made for the cathedral's belfry but happened to be too big for it. Finally it was installed in this arch, which was designed in purpose.

The monument and the mechanism of its clock were fully restored in 1973.

References

Centrul istoric al Chișinǎlui, La începutul secolului al XXI-LEA, Chișinǎu, Editura ARC, 2009
Iurie Colesnic; Petru Starostenco (1997). Chișinău. Enciclopedie. Chișinău: ed. "Museum". pp. 381–382.
Ceasul de pe Arcul de Triumf

Cultural infrastructure completed in 1841
Bessarabia Governorate
Triumphal arches in Moldova
Monuments and memorials in Chișinău